Van Wert may refer to:

Geographical
In the United States:
 Van Wert, Georgia
 Van Wert, Iowa
 Van Wert, Ohio
 Lima-Van Wert-Wapakoneta, OH Combined Statistical Area
 Van Wert County, Ohio

Biographical
 Isaac Van Wert (also known as Isaac Van Wart)

Event-related
 Van Wert and Putnam County 2001 Tornadoes

Other
 Cartersville and Van Wert Railroad